The Pampa finch (Embernagra platensis), also known as the great Pampa-finch, is a species of bird.  It was traditionally placed in the family Emberizidae but molecular phylogenetic studies have shown that it is a member of the tanager family Thraupidae.

Distribution and habitat
It is found in Argentina, Bolivia, Brazil, Paraguay, and Uruguay. Its natural habitats are subtropical or tropical high-altitude shrubland, temperate grassland, subtropical or tropical seasonally wet or flooded lowland grassland, and swamps.

References

Pampa finch
Birds of Brazil
Birds of Bolivia
Birds of Argentina
Birds of the Pampas
Birds of Paraguay
Birds of Uruguay
Pampa finch
Pampa finch
Taxonomy articles created by Polbot